"Manhattan Project" is a 1985 song by Canadian progressive rock band Rush, named after the WWII project that created the first atomic bomb. The song appeared on Rush's eleventh studio album Power Windows in 1985. "Manhattan Project" is the third track on the album and clocks in at 5:07. Despite not being released as a single, it did reach #10 on the U.S. Mainstream Rock Chart.

Lyricist Neil Peart read "a pile of books" about the Manhattan Project before writing the lyrics so that he had a proper understanding of what the project was really about. The song consists of four verses, addressing the following:

A time, during the era of World War II,
A man, representing J. Robert Oppenheimer and other scientists around the world who were engaged in nuclear weapons research,
A place, the Los Alamos facility in New Mexico at which American scientists carried out their work,
A man, Paul Tibbets, pilot of the bomber Enola Gay that dropped the atomic bomb on Hiroshima.

The chorus refers to the explosion as "the big bang", in allusion to the start of a new universe following the singular event, although the absolute reference is the use of Fat Man and Little Boy, America's two nuclear bombs to bring an end to the Pacific conflict with Japan ("shot down the rising sun"), which only happened after both were dropped, repeating the theme of the verses marking when and/or where "it all began." The remaining lines refer to the start of the Atomic Age and the reactions of different segments of the global population ("the big shots," "the fools," "the hopeful," "the hopeless").

Live performances 
Rush performed the song live on their Power Windows Tour, Hold Your Fire Tour, and Presto Tour before it was dropped. It was brought back live over twenty years later on the Clockwork Angels Tour where the band played it with a string ensemble.

Live performances of the song are included on the A Show of Hands concert film, the live album of the same name, and on the Clockwork Angels Tour live album and concert film. An additional live performance (recorded during the Presto Tour) is included in the bonus material on the home media release of Time Stand Still, a 2016 documentary about the band's R40 Live Tour.

See also
List of Rush songs
List of anti-war songs

References 

1985 songs
Rush (band) songs
Song recordings produced by Peter Collins (record producer)
Songs written by Geddy Lee
Songs written by Neil Peart
Songs written by Alex Lifeson
Songs about nuclear war and weapons
Songs based on American history